Emscripten is an LLVM/Clang-based compiler that compiles C and C++ source code to WebAssembly (or to a subset of JavaScript known as asm.js, its original compilation target before the advent of WebAssembly in 2017), primarily for execution in web browsers.

Emscripten allows applications and libraries written in C or C++ to be compiled ahead of time and run efficiently in web browsers, typically at speeds comparable to or faster than interpreted or dynamically compiled JavaScript. It even emulates an entire POSIX operating system, enabling programmers to use functions from the C standard library (libc).

With the more recent development of the WebAssembly System Interface (WASI) and WebAssembly runtimes such as Node.js, Wasmtime, and Wasmer, Emscripten can also be used to compile to WebAssembly for execution in non-Web embeddings as well.

Usage 
Emscripten has been used to port a number of C/C++ code bases to WebAssembly, including Unreal Engine 3, SQLite, MeshLab, Bullet physics. AutoCAD, and a subset of the Qt application framework.  Other examples of software ported to WebAssembly via Emscripten include the following:

Game engines 
The Unity, Godot, and Unreal game engines provide an export option to HTML5, utilizing Emscripten.

Frameworks & toolkits 
openFrameworks exports native C++ applications to HTML5 via Emscripten. emscripten-qt permits compiling applications written using the Qt application framework to WebAssembly.

Software archiving 
In December 2014, the Internet Archive launched a DOSBox emulator compiled in Emscripten to provide browser-based access to thousands of archived MS-DOS and PC programs.

See also

 asm.js
 Google Native Client (PNaCl)
 Haxe
 WebAssembly

References

External links
 
 Project page on GitHub
 Emscripten Documentation
 Porting Examples and Demos
 A list of some WebAssembly runtimes

Compilers
JavaScript libraries
Software using the MIT license
Software using the NCSA license
Source-to-source compilers